{{DISPLAYTITLE:Upsilon2 Eridani}}

Upsilon² Eridani (υ² Eridani, abbreviated Upsilon² Eri, υ² Eri), officially named Theemin , is a star in the constellation of Eridanus. It is visible to the naked eye with an apparent visual magnitude of 3.8. Based upon parallax measurements obtained during the Hipparcos mission, it is approximately 66 parsecs (214 light-years) from the Sun.

This is an evolved red clump giant star with a stellar classification of G8+ III. The measured angular diameter is 2.21 mas. At the star's distance, this yields a physical size of around 16 times the radius of the Sun. It radiates 138 times the solar luminosity from its outer atmosphere at an effective temperature of 5074 K.

Nomenclature 

υ² Eridani (Latinised to Upsilon² Eridani) is the star's Bayer designation.

It bore the traditional name Theemin (also written as Theemim and Beemin). In 2016, the International Astronomical Union organized a Working Group on Star Names (WGSN) to catalogue and standardize proper names for stars. The WGSN approved the name Theemin for this star on February 1, 2017 and it is now so now so included in the List of IAU-approved Star Names. 

In the Almagest, Ptolemy called it hē kampē, "the bend in the river;" Arab writers corrupted this to bhmn, later becoming beemin, beemun in the West. Then, its etymology was incorrectly derived from Hebrew תאומים (te'omim), meaning "twins," producing Theemin.

References

G-type giants
Horizontal-branch stars
Eridanus (constellation)
Theemin
Eridani, Upsilon2
CD-30 01901
Eridani, 52
029291
021393
01464